The 2002–03 ISU Junior Grand Prix was the sixth season of the ISU Junior Grand Prix, a series of international junior level competitions organized by the International Skating Union. It was the junior-level complement to the Grand Prix of Figure Skating, which was for senior-level skaters. Skaters competed in the disciplines of men's singles, ladies' singles, pair skating, and ice dance. The top skaters from the series met at the Junior Grand Prix Final.

Competitions
The locations of the JGP events change yearly. In the 2002–03 season, the series was composed of the following events:

Series notes
At the Junior Grand Prix Final, bronze medalist Miki Ando became the first lady to land a quadruple jump in competition when she landed a quadruple salchow.

Junior Grand Prix Final qualifiers
The following skaters qualified for the 2002–03 Junior Grand Prix Final, in order of qualification.

Joelle Bastiaans was given the host wildcard spot to the Junior Grand Prix Final.

Medalists

Men

Ladies

Pairs

Ice dance

Medals table

References

External links
 Junior Grand Prix, France
 Junior Grand Prix, Yugoslavia
 Junior Grand Prix, Canada
 Junior Grand Prix, USA
 Junior Grand Prix, Slovakia
 Junior Grand Prix, Germany
 Junior Grand Prix, China
 Junior Grand Prix, Italy
 2002–03 ISU Junior Grand Prix Final
 2002–03 Results at ISU
 2002–03 Results at Skate Canada

ISU Junior Grand Prix
2002 in figure skating
2003 in youth sport
2002 in youth sport